Henry Judah Mikell (August 4, 1873 - February 20, 1942) was the second bishop of the Episcopal Diocese of Atlanta from 1917 till 1942.

Background
Henry Judah Mikell, served as Bishop for the Episcopal Diocese of Atlanta from 1917 - 1942.  During this time, he emphasized the need for the Episcopal Church to work with the state's college students, as well as to continue its work among African Americans. Under his leadership the diocese established college centers, which ministered to students at universities and colleges around Georgia. In 1933, as part of his efforts to help young people affected by the depression, Mikell founded "Camp Mikell" at Toccoa Falls. Relocated in 1941 to another site outside of Toccoa, the Mikell Camp and Conference Center continues to support meetings, classes, contemplative retreats, summer camps for kids, and recreational gatherings for Episcopalians of all ages.

Henry Judah Mikell was the 292nd bishop consecrated in the Episcopal Church.

The Mikell Memorial Chapel (1947) at the Cathedral of St. Philip in Atlanta, Georgia, was named in Bishop Mikell's honor.

Mikell was an initiate of the Alpha Alpha Chapter of the Kappa Alpha Order and served as the 18th Knight Commander of the Order from 1926-1934.

See also
 List of Bishop Succession in the Episcopal Church

References
  Article on Bishop Mikell.
  Article on Mikell Memorial Chapel.

References 

Episcopal bishops of Atlanta
Sewanee: The University of the South alumni
American Episcopalians
American religious leaders
People from Sumter, South Carolina
1873 births
1942 deaths